Aleksei Anatolyevich Pugin (born 7 March 1987) is a Russian former football player.

Club career
He made his Russian Premier League debut for FC Torpedo Moscow on 2 August 2014 in a game against PFC CSKA Moscow.

External links
 

1987 births
Sportspeople from Kirov, Kirov Oblast
Living people
Russian footballers
Association football forwards
FC Rotor Volgograd players
FC Torpedo Moscow players
Russian Premier League players
FC Tom Tomsk players
FC Baltika Kaliningrad players
FC Dynamo Bryansk players
FC Ararat Moscow players
FC Dynamo Vologda players
FC Shinnik Yaroslavl players